Adam Treloar (born 9 March 1993) is a professional Australian rules footballer playing for the Western Bulldogs in the Australian Football League (AFL). He previously played for the Greater Western Sydney Giants from 2012 to 2015 and the Collingwood Football Club from 2016 to 2020. Treloar won the Anzac Medal in 2018 and the Neale Daniher Trophy in 2019. He received a nomination for the 2012 AFL Rising Star award in round 18 of the 2012 season.

Personal life 
Treloar was raised in Dandenong.

Treloar attended the Dandenong North Primary School, and later the Dandenong High School.

Junior career 
Treloar player his junior football for Noble Park and later went on to represent Victoria Country in the 2009 AFL Under 18 Championships, winning Vic Country's MVP. He furthered his football by playing in the TAC Cup with the Dandenong Stingrays as well as becoming a member of the AIS-AFL Academy. Adam also represented Vic Country in the 2010 AFL Under 18 Championships. He was named on the half-forward flank of the Under 18 team of the year and played alongside future Greater Western Sydney teammates such as Dylan Shiel, Matthew Buntine, Tomas Bugg, Taylor Adams, and Jeremy Cameron.

AFL career

Greater Western Sydney (2012–2015)
He made his AFL debut in round 3, 2012 against  at Blacktown International Sportspark. He went on to finish fourth overall in the award after receiving 15 out of a possible 45 votes.

Treloar played 20 games during 2013, averaging 24 disposals a match, and finished fifth in the best-and-fairest count. He was touted by former  forward Dermott Brereton as the next Mark Ricciuto, saying that he had the potential to "be an absolute elite player in the midfield and be top five in the comp with his ability, with his skill set and with his want and desire for the game." His 2014 season was described as "brilliant" where he averaged 27.6 disposals and 5.5 tackles in 20 matches and finished fourth in the best-and-fairest count. He was recognised as one of the best young players in the league by being selected on the wing in the AFLPA 22under22 team.

Treloar had his best season to date during 2015 where he was the runner-up in the best-and-fairest, finishing behind Heath Shaw, however, his season was filled with speculation that he would leave the Giants to return to his home state of Victoria. He informed the club in September that he wanted to be traded and nominated Collingwood as his preferred destination.

Collingwood (2016–2020)
Treloar officially joined Collingwood on a six-year deal on 21 October 2015. He had an outstanding first season for the club, playing all 22 games, and lead the club for disposals, tackles, clearances, inside 50s and bounces. At the end of the season he won the R.T. Rush Trophy, finishing second in the Copeland Trophy count, behind skipper Scott Pendlebury. Treloar followed up with a consistent second season at the club in 2017, playing in 21 games. In 2018, Treloar won the Anzac Medal, and later played in the losing grand final to West Coast.

Treloar's 2019 season saw him win plenty of the football, he finished the season with a total of 789 disposals which saw him lead the entire AFL in the home and away season, as well as finals, he also did lead the league in handballs, tallying 454 for the season. His season was highlighted with 40 disposals and 7 tackles against North Melbourne in Round 15, he averaged 32.9 disposals per game, played 24 games and polled 18 Brownlow Medal Votes. He was awarded the Jock McHale Trophy for finishing fourth in the 2019 Copeland Trophy vote count.

As the 2020 AFL season drew to a close, rumours began to circulate that Treloar would seek a move to Queensland, after his partner Kim Ravaillion signed a one-year deal to play netball with the Queensland Firebirds and temporarily relocate to Brisbane with the pair's daughter. It emerged that it was in fact Collingwood seeking to move on Treloar and his remaining five-year contract, citing both salary cap concerns and concern for his mental wellbeing due to the distance from his family - though Treloar remained steadfast in his desire to remain in Victoria. Treloar was traded from Collingwood to the Western Bulldogs on 12 November, in the final minute of trade period. Collingwood received Pick 14 and a future 2nd round pick, while the Bulldogs received Treloar and picks 26, 33 and 42.

Western Bulldogs (2021–present)
Treloar suffered a syndesmosis injury in Round 10 of the 2021 AFL season, which was announced to keep him out of the side for up to two months.  At that stage the Bulldogs had won 9 out of 10 games.  He returned to play from Round 21 onwards, which started with 3 consecutive losses to finish the regular season as the Bulldogs fell out of the Top 4 by just 0.5%, thereby losing the "double chance".  The Bulldogs regained their form to win all 3 finals including the Preliminary Final demolition of Port Adelaide in Adelaide, which set up the Grand Final match against Melbourne in Perth after the bye.

Statistics
Updated to the end of round 1, 2023.

|-
| 2012 || || 17
| 18 || 12 || 5 || 223 || 157 || 380 || 86 || 48 || 0.7 || 0.3 || 12.4 || 8.7 || 21.1 || 4.8 || 2.7 || 0
|-
| 2013 ||  || 17
| 20 || 9 || 6 || 240 || 240 || 480 || 89 || 68 || 0.5 || 0.3 || 12.0 || 12.0 || 24.0 || 4.5 || 3.4 || 0
|-
| 2014 ||  || 17
| 20 || 13 || 11 || 251 || 301 || 552 || 72 || 111 || 0.7 || 0.6 || 12.6 || 15.0 || 27.6 || 3.6 || 5.6 || 5
|-
| 2015 ||  || 17
| 21 || 14 || 11 || 264 || 313 || 577 || 80 || 112 || 0.7 || 0.5 || 12.6 || 14.9 || 27.5 || 3.8 || 5.3 || 7
|-
| 2016 ||  || 7
| 22 || 13 || 18 || 283 || 390 || 673 || 71 || 139 || 0.6 || 0.8 || 12.9 || 17.7 || 30.6 || 3.2 || 6.3 || 21
|-
| 2017 ||  || 7
| 21 || 13 || 11 || 275 || 353 || 628 || 54 || 134 || 0.6 || 0.5 || 13.1 || 16.8 || 29.9 || 2.6 || 6.4 || 11
|-
| 2018 ||  || 7
| 17 || 12 || 15 || 215 || 287 || 502 || 54 || 83 || 0.7 || 0.9 || 12.6 || 16.9 || 29.5 || 3.2 || 4.9 || 8
|-
| 2019 ||  || 7
| 24 || 10 || 4 || 335 || bgcolor=CAE1FF | 454† || bgcolor=CAE1FF | 789† || 95 || 117 || 0.4 || 0.2 || 14.0 || bgcolor=CAE1FF | 18.9† || 32.9 || 4.0 || 4.9 || 18
|-
| 2020 ||  || 7
| 10 || 1 || 4 || 122 || 147 || 269 || 19 || 29 || 0.1 || 0.4 || 12.2 || 14.7 || bgcolor=CAE1FF | 26.9† || 1.9 || 2.9 || 4
|-
| 2021 ||  || 1
| 17 || 13 || 9 || 186 || 209 || 395 || 50 || 73 || 0.8 || 0.5 || 10.9 || 12.3 || 23.2 || 2.9 || 4.3 || 7
|-
| 2022 ||  || 1
| 22 || 15 || 12 || 297 || 298 || 595 || 90 || 70 || 0.7 || 0.5 || 13.5 || 13.5 || 27.0 || 4.1 || 3.2 || 6
|-
| 2023 ||  || 1
| 1 || 1 || 0 || 11 || 21 || 32 || 5 || 6 || 1.0 || 0.0 || 11.0 || 21.0 || 32.0 || 5.0 || 6.0 || 
|- class=sortbottom
! colspan=3 | Career
! 213 !! 126 !! 106 !! 2703 !! 3170 !! 5873 !! 766 !! 990 !! 0.6 !! 0.5 !! 12.7 !! 14.9 !! 27.6 !! 3.6 !! 4.6 !! 87
|}

Notes

Honours and achievements
 Anzac Medal: 2018
 Neale Daniher Trophy: 2019
 2× 22under22 team: 2014, 2015
 AFL Rising Star nominee: 2012

References

External links

 
 

1993 births
Living people
Greater Western Sydney Giants players
Australian rules footballers from Melbourne
Collingwood Football Club players
Dandenong Stingrays players
Western Bulldogs players
People from Dandenong, Victoria